Anthony Wayne Storti (June 19, 1922 – January 23, 2009) was an American football player, coach, and college athletics administrator.  He served as the head football coach at Stout Institute—now known as the University of Wisconsin–Stout–from 1948 to 1951 and two stints at Montana State University, from 1952 to 1954 and from 1956 to 1957, compiling a career college football coaching record of 52–21–3.  Storti was also the athletic director at Montana state from 1952 to 1958.  He led the 1956 Montana State Bobcats to a tie in the NAIA Football National Championship and a share of the NAIA national title.

Biography
A native of Eveleth, Minnesota, Storti served in the United States Army during World War II and attended the University of Wisconsin–Stout and the University of Delaware. He was a member of the football team at both schools. Storti died on January 23, 2009, in Carlsbad, California.

Coaching career
Storti began his coaching career at Stout Institute—now known as the University of Wisconsin–Stout—in 1948. During his tenure at Stout, he compiled a 21–9–2 record.

Storti was named the head football coach and athletic director at Montana State University in 1952. Under his direction, the program won its first national championship in 1956.

Storti is an inductee in the University of Wisconsin–Stout Athletic Hall of Fame and Montana State Bobcat Hall of Fame.

Head coaching record

College

References

1922 births
2009 deaths
Delaware Fightin' Blue Hens football players
Montana State Bobcats athletic directors
Montana State Bobcats football coaches
Wisconsin–Stout Blue Devils football coaches
Wisconsin–Stout Blue Devils football players
United States Army personnel of World War II
United States Army soldiers
Sportspeople from Eveleth, Minnesota